The 1984/85 FIS Freestyle Skiing World Cup was the sixth World Cup season in freestyle skiing organised by International Ski Federation. The season started on 11 December 1984 and ended on 24 March 1985. This season included four disciplines: aerials, moguls, ballet and combined.

Men

Moguls

Ballet

Aerials

Combined

Ladies

Moguls

Ballet

Aerials

Combined

Men's standings

Overall 

Standings after 37 races.

Moguls 

Standings after 10 races.

Aerials 

Standings after 9 races.

Ballet 

Standings after 10 races.

Combined 

Standings after 8 races.

Ladies' standings

Overall 

Standings after 39 races.

Moguls 

Standings after 10 races.

Aerials 

Standings after 10 races.

Ballet 

Standings after 10 races.

Combined 

Standings after 9 races.

References

FIS Freestyle Skiing World Cup
World Cup
World Cup